The Model 49 is a large cylindrical Swiss anti-personnel stake mine. The mine is no longer in service with Swiss forces and all operational stocks of the mine have been destroyed. The mine is normally stake mounted, and uses the ZDZ-39 fuze, which can be operated by either pull or tension release. The mine has a concrete fragmentation jacket with embedded steel fragments.

Specifications
 Diameter: 150 mm
 Height: 220 mm
 Weight: 8.62 kg
 Explosive content: 0.5 kg of TNT
 Operating pressure: 8 kgf (80 N) pull or tension release

External links

References
 Jane's Mines and Mine Clearance 2005-2006

Anti-personnel mines